Gibson Bardsley (born July 23, 1989) is an American soccer player.

Career

Youth and College
Bardsley was born in San Clemente, California and attended Mount Si High School, and played four years of college soccer at Western Washington University. Gibson "Giblits" Bardsley was named a first-team GNAC all-star as a sophomore in 2008, and was named to the Daktronics All-American first team and the Daktronics first team, was an NSCAA West Region All-Star, the Great Northwest Athletic Conference Player of the Year and a unanimous first-team all-league selection as senior in 2010. He finished his college career with 41 goals for the Vikings, tied for first in school history.

During his college years Bardsley also played for the Abbotsford Mariners and Washington Crossfire in the USL Premier Development League.

Professional
Bardsley turned professional in 2011 when he signed for USL Professional Division side Charlotte Eagles. He made his professional debut on April 29, in a game against Charleston Battery.

Bardsley moved to USL Professional Division club Dayton Dutch Lions in April 2012. He joined Orange County Blues FC for 2014. Bardsley played for Tulsa Roughneck FC in 2015 before being transferred to Pembroke Athleta FC of the Malta Premier Division. He signed with Arizona United SC on March 19, 2016.

References

External links
 Western Washington bio
 Gibson Bardsley at lagstatistik.se

1989 births
Living people
Sportspeople from King County, Washington
American soccer players
American expatriate soccer players
Fraser Valley Mariners players
Washington Crossfire players
Phoenix Rising FC players
Charlotte Eagles players
Dayton Dutch Lions players
Orange County SC players
FC Tulsa players
Expatriate soccer players in Canada
USL League Two players
USL Championship players
Soccer players from Washington (state)
Pembroke Athleta F.C. players
Association football forwards
Association football midfielders
People from Fall City, Washington
FC Linköping City players